A special election was held to fill the remainder of the term in the United States House of Representatives for  in the 116th United States Congress. Sean Duffy, the incumbent representative, announced his resignation effective September 23, 2019, as his wife was about to give birth to a child with a heart condition. Governor Tony Evers chose January 27, 2020, as the date for the special election, with the primaries scheduled for December 30, 2019. However, upon being informed by the Department of Justice of the date being in violation of federal law, since it would provide insufficient time for overseas and military voters to receive ballots, Governor Evers rescheduled the primaries for February 18, 2020, and the general election for May 12, 2020.

Republican primary

Candidates

Nominee
Tom Tiffany, state senator for Wisconsin's 12th Senate district

Eliminated in primary
 Jason Church, U.S. Army Veteran and former staffer for U.S. Senator Ron Johnson

Failed to qualify
 Michael Opela Jr., businessman and farmer

Declined
Luke Hilgemann, Republican strategist (endorsed Tiffany)
Brent Jacobson, mayor of Mosinee
Adam Jarchow, former state assemblyman (endorsed Tiffany)
Jerry Petrowski, state senator for Wisconsin's 29th Senate district
Fernando Riveron, surgeon
Romaine Quinn, state assemblyman for Wisconsin's 75th Assembly district (endorsed Tiffany)

Endorsements

Results

Democratic primary

Candidates

Nominee
 Tricia Zunker, president of the Wausau School Board and Associate Justice of the Ho-Chunk Nation Supreme Court

Eliminated in primary
 Lawrence Dale, businessman and Green Party nominee for Wisconsin's 7th congressional district in 2014

Failed to qualify
 Spencer Zimmerman, veteran and perennial candidate

Declined
Janet Bewley, state senator for Wisconsin's 25th Senate district
 Margaret Engebretson, U.S. Navy veteran, attorney, and nominee for Wisconsin's 7th congressional district in 2018
Pat Kreitlow, former state senator for Wisconsin's 23rd Senate district and nominee for Wisconsin's 7th congressional district in 2012
Nick Milroy, state representative for Wisconsin's 73rd Assembly district
 Christine Brewer Muggli, attorney
Tony Schultz, farmer
Kelly Westlund, former congressional staffer for U.S. Senator Tammy Baldwin and nominee for Wisconsin's 7th congressional district in 2014

Endorsements

Results

Independents and third parties

Failed to qualify 
 Douglas Lindee (Constitution)
 Dennis Paulaha (Independent)
 Robert Gary Schuck (Independent)

General election

Predictions

Endorsements

Results

See also
2020 United States House of Representatives elections
2020 United States elections
116th United States Congress
List of special elections to the United States House of Representatives

References

External links
 Wisconsin's 7th Congressional District special election, 2020, Ballotpedia
Official campaign websites
 Tom Tiffany (R) for Congress
 Tricia Zunker (D) for Congress

Wisconsin 2020 07
2020 07
Wisconsin 2020 07
Wisconsin 07
United States House of Representatives 07
United States House of Representatives 2020 07